Catharisa is a genus of moths in the family Saturniidae first described by Karl Jordan in 1911.

Species
Catharisa cerina Jordan, 1911

References

Hemileucinae